Anthony Cohen, CBE, FRSE is a British social anthropologist and served as Principal of Edinburgh’s Queen Margaret University.

Cohen was born in London in 1946. Educated at Whittingehame College, Brighton, the University of Geneva and the University of Southampton, he is a social anthropologist with specialist interests in personal, social and national identity. He conducted fieldwork in Springdale, Newfoundland (1968–70) on local-level politics; and in Whalsay (1973–90), the longest sustained study of a rural British community ever undertaken. He then did research on personal and national identity in Scotland, and on the literary influences on Scottishness.

Anthony Cohen was a research fellow at the Memorial University of Newfoundland; assistant professor at Queen's University and lecturer and senior lecturer in social anthropology at the University of Manchester. In 1988 he was appointed Professor of Social Anthropology at the University of Edinburgh, a post he held until 2003. He was Provost of Law and Social Sciences, and Dean of Social Sciences at Edinburgh for five years (1997—2002). In 2003, he was appointed Honorary Professor of Social Anthropology.

In 2003, he became Principal and Vice-Patron of Queen Margaret University College, Edinburgh, and Professor of Social and Cultural Anthropology. In January 2007, QMUC was awarded university title, and Professor Cohen became the founding Principal and Vice-Chancellor of Queen Margaret University. He was elected Fellow of the Royal Society of Edinburgh in 1994, and was awarded the honorary degree of D.Sc by the University of Edinburgh in 2005, and the degree of D.Sc (honoris causa) by the University of St Andrews in 2017.

He was appointed Commander of the Order of the British Empire (CBE) in the 2008 Birthday Honours.

Works
 The Management of Myths, 1975, Manchester University Press
 The Symbolic Construction of Community, 1985, Routledge
 Whalsay: Symbol, Segment and Boundary in a Shetland Island Community, 1987, Manchester University Press
 Self Consciousness: an Alternative Anthropology of Identity, 1994, Routledge

As editor 

 Symbolising Boundaries: Identity and Diversity in British Cultures, 1986, Manchester University Press
 Humanising the city?: Social contexts of urban life at the turn of the millennium, 1993, Edinburgh University Press
 (with Nigel Rapport) Questions of consciousness, 1995, Routledge
 Signifying Identities: Anthropological perspectives on boundaries and contested values, 2000, Routledge

Footnotes

1946 births
Academics of the University of Edinburgh
Academics of the Victoria University of Manchester
Alumni of the University of Southampton
British anthropologists
Commanders of the Order of the British Empire
Fellows of the Royal Society of Edinburgh
Living people
Academic staff of the Memorial University of Newfoundland
People associated with Queen Margaret University
Academics from London
Academic staff of Queen's University at Kingston
Social anthropologists
University of Geneva alumni
Academics of Queen Margaret University